Nouvion (or sometimes Nouvion-en-Ponthieu) is a commune in the Somme department in Hauts-de-France in northern France.

Geography

Railway
Nouvion had a station on the Noyelles/Forest-l'Abbaye branch of the Réseau des Bains de Mer. It opened on 24 August 1892, and closed on 10 March 1947, although the line itself remained open for freight until 1 February 1951.

Media
Nouvion is the setting for the BBC sitcom 'Allo 'Allo! However, no scenes were filmed in the town, with filming instead taking place in Norfolk in England.

Demography

See also
Communes of the Somme department

References

External links

The community of communes of Nouvion-en-Ponthieu 

Communes of Somme (department)